Francis Matui is an Anglican bishop in Kenya: he is the current Bishop of Makueni.

Matui was educated at St Paul's Theological College, Kabare and St. Paul's University, Limuru. He served in the Anglican Diocese of Machakos from 1993 until his episcopal appointment which was in part of that diocese until the 2013 sub-division.

References

21st-century Anglican bishops of the Anglican Church of Kenya
Anglican bishops of Makueni
Living people
St. Paul's University, Limuru alumni
Year of birth missing (living people)